The Longest Barrel Ride is the second album by the band Slightly Stoopid, released by Skunk Records on November 21, 1998. This album incorporates various elements of reggae, punk, and ska. The track "Violence/FTP" contains a re-recording of "Fuck The Police" from their earlier album, Slightly $toopid. The track "To Little Too Late" is also featured on their acoustic LP, Acoustic Roots: Live & Direct.

The Longest Barrel Ride has two distinct medleys, one starting from "I'm So Stoned" and ending at "Crazy Riff", and another from "Violence/FTP" to "Metal Madness". The first medley has a calmer tone than the aggressive latter.

The song "Slightly Stoopid" contains a guitar riff version of "When The Saints Come Marching In". "Free Dub" contains two hidden tracks, the first being a cover of The Fugs' "I Couldn't Get High" and the second being a song entitled "Nico's." Both songs were later re-recorded on the album Acoustic Roots: Live & Direct.

Track listing

Credits
Slightly Stoopid
Miles - vocals, guitar
Kyle - bass, vocals
Adam - drums

Other Credits
Ikey Owens - keyboards on tracks 1, 6, 7, 9, 12, 14, 16, 20
Miguel - background vocals on track 2, lead guitar on tracks 11, 18
Rakan - vocals on track 6
Z-Man - vocals on track 11
Field Marshall - drums on tracks 12, 20
Tim Wu - sax on tracks 15, 16
Cover Art by Billy Albers

References

Slightly Stoopid albums
1998 albums
Skunk Records albums